This is a list of cities, towns and village flags in the United Kingdom. Flags listed below must be cited and recognised by a local or national body.

England

Cities & Large Towns

Small Towns & Villages

Historical

Northern Ireland

Cities

Scotland

Cities

Wales

Cities & Towns

Villages & Miscellaneous

References

External links 
British City, town & village flags